The Chiayi Cultural and Creative Industries Park or G9 Creative Park is a multi-purpose park in West District, Chiayi City, Taiwan.

History
The area was originally opened in 1916 as Chiayi Brewery by the Japanese government. In 1922, the brewery company went public. In the 1970s, local people began referring the brewery as Chiayi Old Distillery. It operated until 1999 when the Jiji earthquake destroyed the brewery chimney from 53 meters high to just 18 meters. Soon later it was then converted into the Chiayi Cultural and Creative Industries Park and was opened in 2003. On 11 January 2016, the park underwent three-year major renovation by the Ministry of Culture.

Architecture
The park consists of 21 buildings.

Transportation
The park is accessible within walking distance south west from Chiayi Station of Taiwan Railways.

See also
 List of tourist attractions in Taiwan

References

External links

  

2003 establishments in Taiwan
Art centers in Chiayi
Brewery buildings
Cultural centers in Chiayi
West District